The 1981 AIAW National Division I Basketball Championship was held on March 18–29, 1981.  Twenty-four teams were invited, with eight teams receiving first round byes.  First round games were played at on-campus locations.  Louisiana Tech University was crowned national champion at the conclusion of the tournament.  Louisiana Tech finished undefeated (34–0), becoming the third undefeated national champion.

The host site for the Final Four was Eugene, Oregon, and the championship game was again broadcast live on NBC.

This was the first year that the National Association of Intercollegiate Athletics sponsored a competing women's basketball championship for its collegiate members and the last year before the NCAA began sponsoring tournaments for its three divisions and their members.

Opening rounds

Central Regional

West Regional

South Regional

East Regional

Final Four – Eugene, OR

See also
1981 AIAW National Division II Basketball Championship
1981 AIAW National Division III Basketball Championship
 1981 NAIA women's basketball tournament

References

AIAW women's basketball tournament
AIAW
AIAW National Division I Basketball Championship
1981 in sports in Oregon
Women's sports in Oregon